= Intrinsic happiness =

Intrinsic happiness may refer to:

- Happiness
- Intrinsic motivation
